Casuaria armata is a species of snout moth in the genus Casuaria. It was described by Francis Walker in 1866, and is known from Brazil and Colombia.

References

Moths described in 1875
Chrysauginae